Hondo High School is a public high school located in Hondo, Texas (USA). It is part of the Hondo Independent School District located in central Medina County and classified as a 4A school by the UIL.  Hondo ISD was established in 1904 and the first high school building built in 1904.  In 2015, the school was rated "Met Standard" by the Texas Education Agency.

History

The Hondo School District was organized in 1883 and became an independent district in 1904.  In 1904, a six-room two-story building was built with an $8,000 bond.  The building received an addition with a $10,000 bond for three additional rooms and an auditorium upstairs.  In 1927 the 2nd floor was removed and the remaining one-story building was covered in white stucco.  In the 1930s, the school received more additions with the Lacey School, two-story administration building, and a gymnasium.  In the mid-1970s the Lacey School and the two-story administration building were demolished to make way for a track.  In 1974, the gymnasium was retrofit to house the high school band program and a divider wall built to create a space for the wood shop class.  The original high school building was constructed in 1904; it was demolished in May, 2020. It was used as the Might Owl Band Hall from the 1970s to 2020.   In 1950 a new high school was constructed and after several renovations and additions it is still in use today. In 2017, a new gymnasium was constructed as well as a new Career and Technologies building. In 2020, a new Fine Arts Building was constructed and includes two Band Halls, and auditorium, dressing rooms, a scene shop, and an art room.

Athletics
The Hondo Owls compete in these sports - 

Cross Country, Volleyball, Football, Basketball, Powerlifting, Golf, Team Tennis, Tennis, Track and Field, Softball and Baseball. Hondo High School intends to start a Soccer program in the 2021-2022 school year.

State titles
Boys Cross Country - 
1980(3A), 1981(3A)

State finalists
Football - 
1956(1A)

State Qualifiers
Golf - 2021 (4A)

Track - 2021 (4A)

Fine Arts
Band, Theater, and Art

State Champions
1983 - 1st Place State Marching Band division 3A

State Finalists
1981 - 3rd place in State Marching Band division 3A

1983 - 1st place in State Marching Band division 3A

1994 - 4th place in State Marching Band division 3A

State Qualifiers
1980 - State Qualifier division 3A

1981 - State Qualifier division 3A

1983 - State Qualifier division 3A

1984 - State Qualifier division 3A

1985 - State Qualifier division 3A

1994 - State Qualifier division 3A

2020 - State Qualifier division 4A

2021 - State Qualifier division 4A

References

External links
 
 

Schools in Medina County, Texas
Public high schools in Texas
1904 establishments in Texas